The Cursed: Dead Man’s Prey is a 2021 South Korean occult thriller film, directed by Kim Yong-wan and starring Uhm Ji-won, Jung Ji-so and Oh Yoon-ah. The film written by Yeon Sang-ho is an extended version of the 2020 drama The Cursed. It tells the story of a girl, who pursues the truth of an incident in which the culprit of a peculiar serial murder case turns out to be a revived corpse "again". It was released in theatres on July 28, 2021. It marked the final film appearance of Kim Mi-soo before her death in January 2022.

Cast
 Uhm Ji-won as Im Jin-hee, a reporter from the Ministry of Social Affairs, pursues the truth of the case
 Jung Ji-so as Baek So-jin, a methodist
 Jung Moon-sung as Jeong Seong-jun
 Oh Yoon-ah as Major company executive director
 Ko Kyu-pil
 Kim In-kwon
 Kwon Hae-hyo
 Lee Seol as Jessy (an independent news channel Urban Detective)
 Kim Mi-soo as Reporter

Production
On July 16, 2020, it was reported that the drama The Cursed will be adapted into a film with the same cast of Uhm Ji-won and Jung Ji-so. The film to be directed by Kim Yong-wan and written by Yeon Sang-ho will be produced by Climax Studios on the planning of Studio Dragon. Oh Yoon-ah, and Lee Seol were to join the cast.

The filming began on September 9, 2020 and was wrapped up on December 5.

Release
The film was released on July 28, 2021 on 838 screens. It was also selected in 'Korean Cinema Today - Panorama Section' at the 26th Busan International Film Festival and was screened on October 8, 2021.

The film was invited to the 40th Brussels International Fantastic Film Festival and was screened for Belgian premiere on August 30, 2022.

Reception

Box office
According to the integrated computer network for movie theater admissions by the Korea Film Council (KoFiC), the film was in 4th place at the Korean box office by collecting 28,544 audiences on the opening day of its release.

According to Korean Film Council (Kofic) data, it is in 13th place among all the Korean films released in the year 2021, with a gross of 	US$1.31 million and 175,578 admissions, .

Critical response
Kim Seong-hoon writing for Cine21 said that the film based on the 2020 drama The Cursed, has retained the settings of drama but the narrative is built on action instead of suspense. Kim opined that scenes of pursuit by resurrected corpses and killing were striking. Kim concluded the review, by writing, "The second half of the film, which reveals the story of redemption, is sharp enough to reveal the bare face of Korean society."

Son Jeong-bin of Newsis felt that the action in the film is pleasing to the eyes. Son wrote that fantasy settings were attractive, but the story was weak. Son opined that the film being a sequel to the drama The Cursed, could be a deterrent for the audience. Concluding Son wrote, "of course, it is true that the film can be enjoyed without prior knowledge of the drama 'How', but it is also appropriate to point out that the connection between the two works does not give the main character an opportunity to easily immerse himself in it"

Home media
The film is available for streaming on video on demand service at IPTV and digital cable TV from August 12, 2021.

References

External links
 
 
 
 

CJ Entertainment films
2020s Korean-language films
2021 films
South Korean supernatural thriller films
2020s supernatural thriller films
2021 thriller films